Johann Joseph Keel (15 March 1837, in St. Gallen – 12 August 1902) was a Swiss politician and President of the Swiss National Council (1896/1897).

Further reading

External links 
 
 

1837 births
1902 deaths
People from St. Gallen (city)
Swiss Roman Catholics
Christian Democratic People's Party of Switzerland politicians
Members of the National Council (Switzerland)
Presidents of the National Council (Switzerland)